In the geometry of numbers, the Klein polyhedron, named after Felix Klein, is used to generalize the concept of continued fractions to higher dimensions.

Definition 

Let  be a closed simplicial cone in Euclidean space .

Relation to continued fractions 

Suppose  is an irrational number.

Graphs associated with the Klein polyhedron 

The boundary  of a Klein polyhedron is called a sail. Associated with the sail  of an irrational cone are two graphs:

 

Assuming that  has been triangulated, the vertices of each of the graphs  and  can be described in terms of the graph :

Generalization of Lagrange's theorem 

Klein polyhedra allow us to generalize this result.

The path is called periodic, with period , if  for all . The period matrix of such a path is defined to be .

  is split over some totally real algebraic number field of degree .
 For each of the  there is  periodic path of vertices  in  such that the  asymptotically approach the line ; and the period matrices of these paths all commute.
 For each of the  there is  periodic path of chambers  in  such that the  asymptotically approach the hyperplane ; and the period matrices of these paths all commute.

Example 

Let , so that , and let .

Generalization of approximability 

A real number  is called badly approximable if  is bounded away from zero. An irrational number is badly approximable if and only if the partial quotients of its continued fraction are bounded. This fact admits of a generalization in terms of Klein polyhedra.

Given vectors , let .

Let  be the sail of an irrational simplicial cone .

See also 

 Building (mathematics)

References 

O. N. German, 2007, "Klein polyhedra and lattices with positive norm minima". Journal de théorie des nombres de Bordeaux 19: 175–190.
E. I. Korkina, 1995, "Two-dimensional continued fractions. The simplest examples". Proc. Steklov Institute of Mathematics 209: 124–144.
G. Lachaud, 1998, "Sails and Klein polyhedra" in Contemporary Mathematics 210. American Mathematical Society: 373–385.

Geometry of numbers